The British Racing and Sports Car Club (BRSCC) is one of the major organisers of motorsport events in the United Kingdom. The club currently runs around forty track racing championships for cars as diverse as Caterham, BMWs and Mazda. Formed in Bristol in August 1946 as the 500 Club, the organisation changed its name to the BRSCC in 1954 and now has its headquarters in West Malling, Kent.

History
The 500 Club, as it was then known, was founded in 1946. The club promoted racing in 500 c.c. single-seater racing cars, later known as Formula Three. Motor Sport reported in 1947: "The 500 Club's Patron is Earl Howe, its President S.C.H. Davis, and its Vice-Presidents Messrs. Findon, Mays and Pomeroy-which speaks for itself. A stall will be occupied by the Club at the next Shelsley Walsh hill-climb, and its magazine "Iota" will be on sale there." The name was subsequently changed to The Half Litre Club on becoming a limited liability Company.

In 1954 Motor Sport reported: "The Half-Litre C.C. is contemplating changing its name to the British Racing and Sports-Car Club, in view of changed activities."

In 1966 the BRSCC staged the seventh Racing Car Show, 19–29 January, at Olympia West Hall, London. By this time the club magazine was called Motor Racing.

BRSCC Championship Roster

British GT card
 British GT Championship

TCR UK card

TCR UK Touring Car Championship & Dunlop Touring Car Trophy
 AIRTEC Motorsport Fiesta ST240 Championship
 Fiesta ST150 Challenge (for 2023 known as Vinyl Detail Fiesta ST150 Challenge for sponsorship reasons)
 BRSCC Fiesta Junior Championship
BRSCC CityCar Cup (for 2023 known as Nankang Tyre Citycar Cup for sponsorship reasons)

BRSCC card
Note this card may be combined at larger festival weekends or split over multiple weekends.
 Silverlake C1 Endurance Series
 Avon Tyres National Formula Ford Championship
 Avon Tyres Super Classic Pre ’99 Formula Ford Championship  (previously Avon Tyres Northern & Super Classic Formula Ford Championship)
 BRSCC Clubsport Trophy
 BRSCC SuperSport Endurance Cup
 BRSCC Mazda MX-5 Championship
 BRSCC Mazda MX-5 SuperCup
 BRSCC Mazda MX-5 Clubman Championship
Modified Ford Series

BRSCC Evolution Trophy (new for 2023) 
 Classic VW Cup
 Cooksport Renault Cup
 BRSCC Mazda MX-5 Mk4 Trophy
 BRSCC BMW 1 Series SuperCup

Further series and festival events
 BRSCC Formula Ford Festival
 Audi TT Cup Racing (new for 2023)
 MG Metro Cup
 ZEO Prototype Series
 Civic Cup
 Fun Cup Championship

Unconfirmed 
 Ford F4 British Championship
 Hyperdrive ST-XR Challenge
 Nankang Tyres BMW Compact Cup
 Teekay Couplings Production GTi Championship
Volkswagen Racing Cup
 W Series

Historical
BRSCC were the nominated organising body for these events until the year given. 
Caterham Academy Championship
Caterham Roadsport Championship
Caterham Seven 270R Championship
Caterham Seven 310R Championship
Caterham Seven UK Championship

See also
 2018 TCR UK Touring Car Championship
 British Automobile Racing Club
 British Racing Drivers' Club
 Motorsport in the United Kingdom

References

External links
 BRSCC website

Motorsport organisations in the United Kingdom
1946 establishments in the United Kingdom
Organisations based in Kent
Sport in Kent
Sports organizations established in 1946
Tonbridge and Malling